Anh Thơ (Ninh Giang, Hải Dương Province, 25 January 1921 – 14 March 2005), real name Vương Kiều Ân, was a Vietnamese poet.

In 1943, she published Hương Xuân, the first poetry collection by women poets in quốc ngữ, together with Hằng Phương, Vân Đài and Mộng Tuyết.

Works
Bức tranh quê ("Country", 1939)
Xưa ("Old", 1942)
Răng đen ("Black Tooth" novel, 1943)
Hương xuân ("Perfume of Spring" collaboration, 1944)
Kể chuyện Vũ Lăng (1957)
Theo cánh chim câu ("According to the Bird", 1960)
Ðảo ngọc ("The Pearl", 1964)
Hoa dứa trắng ("White pineapple", 1967)
Quê chồng (1979)
Lệ sương (1995)
Hồi ký Anh Thơ (Memoris, 2002 3 Vol)

References

20th-century Vietnamese poets
1921 births
2005 deaths
Vietnamese women poets
20th-century Vietnamese women writers
21st-century Vietnamese women writers